Vade Mecum II is an album by American jazz trumpeter Bill Dixon recorded in 1993 and released on the Italian Soul Note label.

Reception

In his review for AllMusic, Brian Olewnick stated "It is... one of the very finest jazz albums of the '90s and one that cannot be recommended too highly."

The authors of The Penguin Guide to Jazz Recordings noted that, in relation to the first volume of Vade Mecum, volume 2 is "more coherent and cogent." They praised the "stirring thoughtfulness [of] Dixon's spacious solo lines," noting that their logic "carries each piece forward to a satisfactory conclusion."

Track listing
All compositions by Bill Dixon
 "Valentina Di Sera" - 3:07
 "Tableau" - 10:21
 "Ebonite" - 15:51
 "Reflections" - 15:28
 "Incunabula" - 13:33
 "Octette #1" - 11:45

Personnel
Bill Dixon - trumpet, flugelhorn
 Barry Guy, William Parker - bass
Tony Oxley - percussion

References 

1996 albums
Bill Dixon albums
Black Saint/Soul Note albums